Of the 6 Oklahoma incumbents, 4 were re-elected.

See also 
 List of United States representatives from Oklahoma
 United States House of Representatives elections, 1972

1972
Oklahoma
1972 Oklahoma elections